Ageratina macbridei is a species of flowering plant in the family Asteraceae. It is endemic to Peru, where it occurs in several types of habitats, often near rivers.

Etymology
Ageratina is derived from Greek meaning 'un-aging', in reference to the flowers keeping their color for a long time. This name was used by Dioscorides for a number of different plants.

References

macbridei
Endemic flora of Peru
Plants described in 1923
Taxonomy articles created by Polbot